Mayurakshi Institute of Engineering & Technology is a technical institute in Jodhpur, in the district of Rajasthan, India. It was established in 2009 as a private aided self-financing co-educational institute. The college is affiliated to Bikaner Technical University and is approved by the All India Council for Technical Education.

Academics
Integrated first degree

Mayurakshi offers four-year programmes in Bachelor of Engineering in the following fields:
 Civil engineering
 Electrical engineering
 Mechanical engineering
 Computer science
 Electronics and communication engineering
 Information technology

Mayurakshi has also started a polytechnic college in which it offers diplomas in civil, mechanical and electrical engineering.

See also
 List of universities and higher education colleges in Jodhpur
 Rajasthan Technical University
 Jodhpur National University
Arid Forest Research Institute (AFRI) Jodhpur

References

Engineering colleges in Jodhpur
Colleges in Jodhpur